The Swarm is a 1978 American natural horror film directed and produced by Irwin Allen, and based on Arthur Herzog's 1974 novel. It stars an ensemble cast, including Michael Caine, Katharine Ross, Richard Widmark, Richard Chamberlain, Olivia de Havilland, Ben Johnson, Lee Grant, José Ferrer, Patty Duke, Slim Pickens, Bradford Dillman, Henry Fonda and Fred MacMurray in his final film role. It follows a scientist and a military task force who try to prevent a large swarm of killer bees from invading Texas. The film received overwhelmingly negative reviews from critics and was a box-office bomb. It has been considered to be one of the worst films ever made. Despite this, Paul Zastupnevich was nominated for the Academy Award for Best Costume Design.

Plot 
In south Texas, a top-security United States Air Force ICBM command bunker is invaded and neutralized by an unknown force.  An Air Force unit, led by Major Baker (Bradford Dillman), investigates, and comes across an unauthorized scientist at the secured base, Dr. Bradford Crane (Michael Caine), who was tracking a large swarm of killer bees, when they attacked the Air Force bunker. General Slater (Richard Widmark) orders two helicopters to check the area, whereupon the helicopters are destroyed by the swarm of bees. Crane insists to Slater that the base was attacked by the same African killer bees that destroyed the helicopters. Helena Anderson (Katharine Ross), one of the base's doctors, supports Crane's story.

Meanwhile, in the nearby countryside, the Durant family is attacked by the swarm of the bees. The mother and father die from the bee stings, but Paul, their son, escapes in a Mustang. Although he is stung, Paul manages to make it into town and crashes into the Marysville town square, where the citizens are preparing for the annual flower festival. The boy is brought into the hands of military personnel, where he hallucinates a vision of giant bees attacking him, due to the aftereffects of the bee sting. Wheelchair-bound Dr. Walter Krim (Henry Fonda) confirms to Crane that the very war they have feared for a long time has started against the bees. At the gates of the base, Slater confronts angry county engineer Jed Hawkins (Slim Pickens), who demands to see the dead body of his son, an airman in the bunker, who was killed by the bees. Hawkins takes the body bag and departs, leaving the entire watching crowd silent over the loss. Slater suggests airdropping poison on the swarm, but Crane considers the ecological possibilities of the situation, as the poison will wipe out plant growth for a decade or more.

Recovering from his earlier bee attack, Paul and his friends search for the hive to firebomb it in revenge for his family, which results only in angering the bees, who make their way to Marysville, where they kill hundreds, including some children at the local school. Crane and Helena take shelter at the local diner, with pregnant café waitress Rita. Reporter Anne McGregor (Lee Grant) watches from the safety of her news van, hoping to get some exciting footage about the siege. After this most recent attack, and fear of another one, Slater suggests evacuating many of the townsfolk in a train. However, the bees attack the train, causing the locomotive derail over a cliff, killing everyone aboard, including a love triangle made up of schoolteacher Maureen Scheuster, retiree Felix Austin, and town mayor and drug store owner Clarence Tuttle.

Rita tries to board the ill-fated train but is saved at the last minute by going into labor and is confined to the hospital. She gives birth to her child while falling in love with the doctor in the process; but Paul suffers a relapse from the effects of being stung earlier and later dies, devastating Helena and sending her into a rage about why the children have to die. The savage swarm heads for Houston, Texas, and Crane decides to drop eco-friendly poison pellets on them, hoping that the swarm senses will harm them and stay away from the city. Unfortunately, the plan fails. Dr. Krim self-injects an experimental bee venom antidote, planning to track the results, but the trial proves fatal and he dies. Meanwhile, nuclear power plant manager Dr. Andrews (José Ferrer) is convinced that his plant can withstand the attacks of the bees, ignoring the warnings of Dr. Hubbard (Richard Chamberlain). However, the bees invade the plant, causing a nuclear explosion, killing Andrews and Hubbard, destroying the plant, and wiping out a nearby town.

Meanwhile, in Houston, Crane analyzes tapes from the bee invasion and comes to the conclusion that a test of an alarm system at the ICBM bunker attracted the swarm into the base. The bees attack Houston, resulting in the deaths of Major Baker and Dr. Newman, one of Crane's associates. Slater sacrifices himself to save Crane and Helena from the bees. Helicopters playing the alarm sound from the ICBM bunker over loudspeakers lure the bees out to sea, where they douse the water with oil and set the swarm ablaze. Helena wonders if their victory was just temporary. Crane responds that he does not know, but decides that "if we use our time wisely, the world just might survive."

Cast

Production 
The film was announced in 1974 at the height of the disaster-movie craze. It was part of $38 million worth of projects Allen had lined up, others including The Day the World Ended (a project which was retitled and released in 1980 as When Time Ran Out....)  The script was written by Stirling Silliphant, who had written The Towering Inferno for Allen. He said in December 1974 that Allen hoped to start filming in April 1975. Production was delayed in part because Allen decided to leave Fox for Warner Bros. Estimates of the numbers of bees used in the production ranged between 15 million and 22 million, including 800,000 bees with their stingers removed to enable the cast to work safely with them. About 100 people were employed in the production to care for and transport the bees during the film shoot. Olivia de Havilland was stung by a bee while filming. Fred MacMurray retired from acting after completing this film.

Reception 
The film received overwhelmingly negative reviews from critics. It has a score of 9% on Rotten Tomatoes based on twenty-three reviews, with an average rating of 3.9/10. It was one of two disaster films (the other being Beyond the Poseidon Adventure) directed solely by the "master of disaster" Allen, who had experience directing several films and many episodes of his TV shows - and both featured Michael Caine in the leading role. The film is listed in Golden Raspberry Award founder John J.B. Wilson's book The Official Razzie Movie Guide as one of the 100 Most Enjoyably Bad Movies Ever Made, where Wilson states that under Allen's unsubtle direction, "despite the enormous production budget, The Swarm turned the tale of an invasion of killer bees into the ultimate B movie."

Vincent Canby of The New York Times called the film "nothing less than the ultimate apotheosis of yesterday's B-movie." Comparing the film unfavorably to recent blockbusters such as Star Wars and Grease, which also evoked old B-movies, he wrote, "Allen merely reproduces a tacky genre while spending a great deal of money doing it. There's not a frame of film, not a twist of plot, not a line of dialogue, not a performance in The Swarm that suggests real appreciation for film history, only a slavish desire to imitate it. That's not enough." Gene Siskel of the Chicago Tribune gave the film 1.5 out of 4 stars and wrote that it was "surprisingly flaccid in its thrills", explaining: "In these days of Star Wars (which was made for less money), it takes more than a fleet of helicopters and a flameout on the Gulf of Mexico to convince audiences that they are being dazzled." Arthur D. Murphy of Variety called it a "disappointing and tired non-thriller. Killer bees periodically interrupt the arch writing, stilted direction and ludicrous acting."

Kevin Thomas of the Los Angeles Times wrote that the film was "fun in its primitive way", adding that "one wishes it were silent, as were the DeMille epics of the '20s it so closely resembles." Tom Zito of The Washington Post wrote, "While subtlety has never been a strong theme in Allen's films, The Swarm does manage to turn the industrious little honeybee into a menace so seemingly convincing that America may go bee-crazy this summer." Richard Velt in the Wilmington Morning Star stated "The Swarm may not be the worst movie ever made. I'd have to see them all to be sure. It's certainly as bad as any I've seen." Velt also stated "All the actors involved in this fiasco should
be ashamed". James Baker of Newsweek declared, "It may be early, but it's probably safe to nominate The Swarm for the worst movie of the year."

The Sunday Times described The Swarm as "simply the worst film ever made", while Time Out magazine called The Swarm a "risibly inadequate disaster movie". Leslie Halliwell called The Swarm a "very obvious disaster movie with risible dialogue", and suggested its commercial failure was partly due to the fact that prior to its release, several American television movies with similar plots had been broadcast. TV Guide said- 'The Swarm is a B movie in every sense of the term. Somehow disaster-movie king Allen convinced top Hollywood stars (including five Oscar winners) to appear in this nonsense'.

Box office 
The film grossed $5,168,142 in its opening weekend from more than 1,200 theatres and earned Warner Bros. rentals in the United States and Canada of $7.7 million. It was considered a commercial failure.

Score 

The musical score was composed by Academy Award winner Jerry Goldsmith. It used French horns and comparable instruments, which were intended to produce sound effects intended to resemble the sound of an apiary mega-swarm. The score originally was released on LP and cassette on Warner Bros. Records in 1978 at the same time as the film's release. An expanded, remastered score was released in 2002 in a limited edition by Prometheus Records and contained over 40 minutes of previously unreleased material. In 2020, La-La Land Records issued a two-CD set with the complete film score and the 1978 soundtrack album.

Home media and alternate versions 

The film was originally released in theaters at 116 minutes, but when released on laserdisc in 1992, it was extended to 156 minutes with additional scenes. This extended version is also included on all DVD releases worldwide, alongside a 22-minute documentary, "Inside The Swarm", and the original theatrical trailer.

It was first released to DVD by Warner Home Video on August 6, 2002, then reissued on January 28, 2016, under their Warner Archive Collection sublabel.

The film was released on Blu-ray on September 25, 2018, again through Warner Archive. Like the two previous DVD releases, it contains the 156-minute extended version, the original theatrical trailer, and the 22-minute making-of documentary.

In the U.S., the film was given a PG rating by the MPAA. In the U.K., the film was released with an A certificate in 1978. The BBFC rated the extended version 12.

Disclaimer 
The ending credits to the film included a disclaimer that read: "The African killer bee portrayed in this film bears absolutely no relationship to the industrious, hardworking American honey bee to which we are indebted for pollinating vital crops that feed our nation." According to an article in HR published on February 24, 1978, the American Bee Association considered taking legal action against the film's producers for defaming the western honey bee, but whether the lawsuit was ever filed or not is unknown.

See also 
 List of films considered the worst
 List of killer bee films

References

External links 

 
 
 
 
 
 
 Irwin Allen News Network (The Irwin Allen News Network's Swarm page)

1978 films
1978 horror films
1970s science fiction horror films
1970s thriller films
1970s disaster films
American disaster films
American horror thriller films
American natural horror films
American science fiction horror films
American survival films
1970s English-language films
Fictional bees
Films about bees
Films based on American novels
Films based on thriller novels
Films directed by Irwin Allen
Films produced by Irwin Allen
Films scored by Jerry Goldsmith
Films set in Houston
Films set in Texas
Films set on trains
Films shot in Houston
Films with screenplays by Stirling Silliphant
Warner Bros. films
1970s American films